Fairholme Island is a member of the Queen Elizabeth Islands and the Arctic Archipelago in the territory of Nunavut. It is an irregularly shaped island located in the Penny Strait, between John Barrow Island and the entrance to Barrow Harbour, Devon Island. Sir John Barrow Monument is to the southeast.

Another, smaller Fairholme Island also lies within Nunavut, off Graham Gore Peninsula in the Alexandra Strait.

External links
 Fairholme Island in the Atlas of Canada - Toporama; Natural Resources Canada
 Fairholme Island (smaller) in the Atlas of Canada - Toporama; Natural Resources Canada

Islands of the Queen Elizabeth Islands
Uninhabited islands of Qikiqtaaluk Region
Islands of Baffin Bay